Victor Hall (born December 4, 1968) is a former American football player who played eight seasons in the Arena Football League with the Orlando Predators and Los Angeles Avengers. He played college football at Auburn University.

References

External links
Just Sports Stats
College stats

Living people
1968 births
Players of American football from Alabama
American football offensive linemen
American football defensive linemen
American football tight ends
Auburn Tigers football players
Orlando Predators players
Barcelona Dragons players
Los Angeles Avengers players
Sportspeople from Anniston, Alabama